is a former Japanese football player.

Club statistics
Updated to 11 December 2014.

References

External links

J. League (#28)

1988 births
Living people
University of Tsukuba alumni
Association football people from Hokkaido
Japanese footballers
J1 League players
J2 League players
J3 League players
Vegalta Sendai players
Tochigi SC players
FC Machida Zelvia players
Association football defenders
Sportspeople from Sapporo